Kirchzarten is a town in the district of Breisgau-Hochschwarzwald in the federal-state of Baden-Württemberg in southwestern Germany.

A Zionist agricultural training farm was founded in Kirchzarten in 1919 to prepare young people to become farmers in Mandatory Palestine [Eretz Israel].

The Kirchzarten synagogue had a set of Jugendstil windows by artist Friedrich Adler, who made a duplicate set now in the Tel Aviv Museum of Art.

Gallery

See also
Kirchzarten Airfield

References

Breisgau-Hochschwarzwald
Baden